Matthew Reid "Matt" Grosjean (born September 21, 1970) is an American former alpine skier who competed in the 1992 Winter Olympics, 1994 Winter Olympics, and 1998 Winter Olympics. He was born in Chicago, Illinois.

References
 

1970 births
Living people
American male alpine skiers
Olympic alpine skiers of the United States
Alpine skiers at the 1992 Winter Olympics
Alpine skiers at the 1994 Winter Olympics
Alpine skiers at the 1998 Winter Olympics
20th-century American people